Richard Ewen Borcherds (born 29 November 1959) is a British mathematician currently working in quantum field theory. He is known for his work in lattices, group theory, and infinite-dimensional algebras, for which he was awarded the Fields Medal in 1998.

Early life 
Borcherds was born in Cape Town, South Africa, but the family moved to Birmingham in the United Kingdom when he was six months old.

Education 
Borcherds was educated at King Edward's School, Birmingham, and Trinity College, Cambridge, where he studied under John Horton Conway.

Career 
After receiving his doctorate in 1985, Borcherds has held various alternating positions at Cambridge and the University of California, Berkeley, serving as Morrey Assistant Professor of Mathematics at Berkeley from 1987 to 1988. He was a Royal Society University Research Fellow. From 1996 he held a Royal Society Research Professorship at Cambridge before returning to Berkeley in 1999 as Professor of Mathematics. 

An interview with Simon Singh for The Guardian, in which Borcherds suggested he might have some traits associated with Asperger syndrome, subsequently led to a chapter about him in a book on autism by Simon Baron-Cohen. Baron-Cohen concluded that while Borcherds had many autistic traits, he did not merit a formal diagnosis of Asperger syndrome.

Awards and honours 
In 1992 Borcherds was one of the first recipients of the EMS prizes awarded at the first European Congress of Mathematics in Paris, and in 1994 he was an invited speaker at the International Congress of Mathematicians in Zurich. In 1994, he was elected to be a Fellow of the Royal Society. In 1998 at the 23rd International Congress of Mathematicians in Berlin, Germany he received the Fields Medal together with Maxim Kontsevich, William Timothy Gowers and Curtis T. McMullen. The award cited him "for his contributions to algebra, the theory of automorphic forms, and mathematical physics, including the introduction of vertex algebras and Borcherds' Lie algebras, the proof of the Conway-Norton moonshine conjecture and the discovery of a new class of automorphic infinite products." In 2012 he became a fellow of the American Mathematical Society, and in 2014 he was elected to the National Academy of Sciences.

References

Further reading 
 Conway and Sloane, Sphere Packings, Lattices, and Groups, Third Edition, Springer, 1998 .
 Frenkel, Lepowsky and Meurman, Vertex Operator Algebras and the Monster, Academic Press, 1988 .
 Kac, Victor, Vertex Algebras for Beginners, Second Edition, AMS 1997 .

External links 
 
 

20th-century British mathematicians
21st-century British mathematicians
Fields Medalists
Group theorists
Fellows of the Royal Society
Fellows of the American Mathematical Society
Members of the United States National Academy of Sciences
University of California, Berkeley College of Letters and Science faculty
1959 births
Living people
People educated at King Edward's School, Birmingham
Alumni of Trinity College, Cambridge
Whitehead Prize winners
International Mathematical Olympiad participants
British expatriate academics in the United States